The Row Collection is a collection of philatelic material relating to Siam that forms part of the British Library Philatelic Collections. The collection covers the period 1883 to 1918 in 22 volumes. It is mainly of unused material with many blocks, and strong in the various provisional surcharges. It also includes some postal stationery and issues used in Kedah and Kelantan. It was formed by Harold Row and presented to the British Museum in 1919 by Row's mother, Mrs Eliza Row.

See also
Postage stamps and postal history of Thailand

References

British Library Philatelic Collections
Postage stamps of Thailand